is the fifth compilation album by J-pop duo Two-Mix, released by King Records on June 8, 2011. The album covers the duo's singles, B-sides, and other tracks from 1995 to 1998. It was the duo's first new release since the 2002 box set Two-Mix Collection Box: Categorhythm.

The album peaked at No. 103 on Oricon's weekly albums chart.

Track listing 
All lyrics are written by Shiina Nagano; all music is composed by Minami Takayama, except where indicated; all music is arranged by Two-Mix.

Charts

References

External links 
 
 
 

2011 compilation albums
Two-Mix compilation albums
Japanese-language compilation albums
King Records (Japan) compilation albums